At least three warships of Japan have been named Arashio:

, an  launched in 1937 and sunk in 1943.
, an  launched in 1968 and struck in 1986.
, a  launched in 1992 and struck in 2012.

Japanese Navy ship names
Japan Maritime Self-Defense Force ship names